Thomas Land is a themed area at Drayton Manor Resort in Staffordshire, England, based on the popular long-running children's television series, Thomas & Friends. It stands on the former site of Robinsons Land, a themed area sponsored by the soft drinks brand of the same name. The construction began while the park was still open in September 2007, and many of the Robinsons Land rides were moved to other areas of the park for the remainder of the season. Many of the rides housed in Robinsons Land except the Veteran Cars (now Sodor's Classic Cars) were sold to Funland in Hayling Island. Thomas Land officially opened to the public on 15 March 2008. An expansion of Thomas Land with additional attractions and private party rooms opened on 8 April 2015.

Rides 

Train rides

Models of Thomas, Percy and Rosie are used on a  narrow gauge railway that takes visitors through the park. The line features Tidmouth Sheds with stationary facades of other engines, Knapford Station, which serves as the main station and a refreshment stand, Dryaw and Tidmouth Hault. It also has many sidings and sheds along the way, one of which used to feature a "sleeping" model of James, which was moved to where the James and the Red Balloon ride is in 2017, akin to the ride's opening.

See also

List of theme parks in the United Kingdom
Thomas Land (Fuji-Q Highland), a Thomas & Friends theme park in Japan

References

External links 
 

Thomas & Friends
Tourist attractions in Staffordshire
Amusement rides introduced in 2008
2 ft gauge railways in England